The 2017 AVP Pro Beach Volleyball Tour was a domestic professional beach volleyball circuit organized in the United States by the Association of Volleyball Professionals (AVP) for the 2017 beach volleyball season. The 2017 AVP Tour calendar comprises the "Gold Series" tournaments and "Open" tournaments.

Schedule

This is the complete schedule of events on the 2017 calendar, with team progression documented from the semifinals stage. All tournaments consisted of single-elimination qualifying rounds followed by a double-elimination main draw.
Key

Men

Women

Rule changes
Prior to the 2017 season, the AVP adopted two rule changes:
A "point freeze" at match point, wherein the scoring system changes from rally scoring (either team can score a point on every serve) to side-out scoring (only serving team can score a point) when either team reaches match point.
"Let" serves, wherein the ball touches the net while crossing over into the opponent's court during service, are not allowed during "point freezes" and the serve will be replayed.

Milestones and events

Huntington Beach Open
Phil Dalhausser won his 50th AVP tournament.

Hermosa Beach Open
The 2017 season marked the return of the Hermosa Beach Open tournament, last held in 2010.
Brothers Marcus and Miles Partain became the youngest pair (combined age) to get into the main draw of an AVP tournament at 17- and 15-years old respectively, after winning all three of their qualifying matches.

Chicago Championships
Sara Hughes and Kelly Claes became the youngest pair (combined age) to win an AVP tournament at 22- and 21-years old respectively.
John Hyden became the oldest player to win an AVP tournament at 44 years and 9 months old.

Miscellaneous
NBC Sports announced that all eight AVP tournaments would be broadcast on either NBC or NBCSN.
AVP required all players competing on the 2017 tour to sign a four-year exclusivity contract which forbids main draw players from playing in non-AVP events unless permission is given by the tour.

Points distribution

Awards
The 2017 AVP Awards Banquet was held on November 4 in Newport Beach, California. The season's top performers were chosen based on statistics, player votes and AVP national ranking points earned during the year.

References

Association of Volleyball Professionals
AVP Pro Beach Volleyball Tour